Robert M. Hanes House is a historic home located at Winston-Salem, Forsyth County, North Carolina. It was built in 1927, and is a -story, five bay, Georgian Revival style brick dwelling. It has a side gable roof with dormers, recessed entrance, and a one-story porch with Tuscan order columns. It is set in a landscape designed by Ellen Biddle Shipman in 1937. Also on the property is a contributing garage (1926–1927), playhouse (c. 1936), and garden house. It was built for Ralph Hanes & his wife, Dewitt Chatham Hanes,  Textile Magnate.   Reference...Southern Cottages, Special Edition, May 2022. 
.

It was listed on the National Register of Historic Places in 2012.

References

Houses on the National Register of Historic Places in North Carolina
Georgian Revival architecture in North Carolina
Houses completed in 1927
Houses in Winston-Salem, North Carolina
National Register of Historic Places in Winston-Salem, North Carolina